Route 160 is a state highway in Connecticut running for  from the Berlin Turnpike (US 5 and Route 15) in Berlin to Route 17 in the South Glastonbury section of Glastonbury. The road crosses the Connecticut River on the Rocky Hill–Glastonbury Ferry. It passes over Interstate 91 in Rocky Hill with no interchange.

Route description
Route 160 begins at an intersection with the Berlin Turnpike (US 5/Route 15) in northeastern Berlin and heads east into Rocky Hill.  It briefly turns south, overlapping with Route 3 before resuming its eastward direction.  It overpasses I-91 without an interchange, and crosses over Route 99.  After passing through the center of town, it reaches the shore of the Connecticut River, and crosses it via the Rocky Hill–Glastonbury Ferry.  In Glastonbury, it continues east to end at an intersection with Route 17 in South Glastonbury. 

A  section of Route 160 in Glastonbury, running from the Connecticut River to Roaring Brook, is designated a scenic road.

History
The Rocky Hill-Glastonbury Ferry began service in 1655.  In 1932, it was incorporated into the newly commissioned Route 160.  Since then, Route 160 has had no major changes.  In 1960, a request by the Town of Glastonbury to extend Route 160 east to the New London Turnpike, near Route 2, was declined by the state.

Junction list

References

External links

160
Transportation in Hartford County, Connecticut